

2009–10 Top 3 Standings

Events summary

Standings

References

- Overall Men, 2010-11 Biathlon World Cup